was a sumo wrestler with the Hanakago beya, an actor and a celebrity in Japan. He was born in Ōta, Tokyo. His highest rank in sumo was komusubi.

Sumo

Career
Ryūko made his tournament debut in the January 1957 basho. He reached the juryō division in March 1967, and makuuchi in March 1968. The following year, he defeated yokozuna Taihō, scoring the first of his two kinboshi. He was a runner-up in three top division tournaments, in March 1969, November 1969 and September 1970.  His 1970 rise to sanyaku was followed by a 1971 torn achilles tendon, as a result of which he missed three successive tournaments and was demoted from makuuchi all the way down to the third makushita division. He returned to sumo, and after winning championships in the makushita and juryo divisions he regained his position in makuuchi in 1973. He scored his second kinboshi (against Kitanoumi) in 1974. He even managed a return to sanyaku at komusubi in January 1975, the first time that any wrestler had done this after dropping to makushita. However, on the first match of the May tournament in that year, he tore the other Achilles tendon, and retired from sumo. He once told an interviewer that he thought rikishi wrestled too much - "Ninety days a year, such a severe tension, it's too much for a human being."

It was as a direct result of public sympathy for Ryūko's plummet down the rankings that the Japan Sumo Association introduced the kosho seido, or public injury system, whereby a wrestler injured during a tournament could sit out the next one without any effect on his rank.

During his career, he earned several awards, taking the Shukunshō twice and the Kantōshō four times.

Fighting style
His favourite techniques were tsuppari (thrusting attack), katasukashi (under-shoulder swing down), migi-yotsu (left hand outside, right hand inside mawashi grip), and sotogake (outer leg trip). He most commonly won by hataki-komi (slap down).

Retirement
After his retirement he worked as a coach at his old stable under the toshiyori or elder name of Hanaregoma, but he left the Sumo Association in February 1977 to seek a new profession.

Acting

Ryūko played the station chief in the 1977 live-actor film version of Kochira Katsushika-ku Kameari Kōen-mae Hashutsujo. He joined the cast of the jidaigeki Abarenbo Shogun during the  first series (about 175 episodes), and continued through the second series (about 190 episodes). His character was a retired sumo wrestler named Ryūko. He also appeared as a guest star in an episode of the fifth series.

Death
He died on August 29, 2014 in Kakegawa, Shizuoka of a heart attack.

Career record
The Nagoya tournament was first held in 1958.

See also
Glossary of sumo terms
List of sumo tournament top division runners-up
List of sumo tournament second division champions
List of past sumo wrestlers
List of komusubi

References

External links

1941 births
People from Ōta, Tokyo
2014 deaths
Japanese sumo wrestlers
Sumo people from Tokyo
Komusubi